Las Brisas Observatory  is an astronomical observatory located 11 miles west of Pikes Peak, Colorado (USA) on Las Brisas ranch. It was built in 1979 and is owned by Paul Signorelli.

See also 
List of observatories

References

External links
Las Brisas Observatory Clear Sky Clock Forecasts of observing conditions.
 https://www.skyandtelescope.com/observing/stargazers-corner/las-brisas-observatory-37-years-and-counting/

Astronomical observatories in Colorado
Buildings and structures in Teller County, Colorado